Twins (rendered in its title sequence logo as TWiiNS) is a 1988 American buddy comedy film produced and directed by Ivan Reitman. The film is about unlikely fraternal twin brothers (Arnold Schwarzenegger and Danny DeVito) who were separated at birth. The core of the film is the contrast between the streetwise Vincent (DeVito) and the intelligent but naive Julius (Schwarzenegger).

The film was a commercial success, grossing $216 million worldwide. Instead of taking their usual salaries for the film, Schwarzenegger, DeVito and Reitman agreed with the studio to take 40% of the film's box office returns; this resulted in them receiving the biggest paychecks of their film careers.

Plot 
1953 

Julius and Vincent Benedict are twin brothers, the result of a secret experiment carried out at a genetics laboratory to combine the DNA of six fathers to produce the perfect child. To the surprise of the scientists, the embryo split and the twins were born. The mother, Mary Ann Benedict, was told that Julius died at birth, and not told about Vincent at all.

Vincent was placed in an orphanage run by nuns in Los Angeles and believed his mother abandoned him. With no one but himself to rely on, Vincent seduced a nun, escaped from the orphanage, and later became an indebted, small time criminal. Julius was raised on a South Pacific island by Professor Werner, one of the scientists from the experiment, who put him through intense physical training and extensive study. Both believed Mary Ann died during childbirth. 

1988

Each twin was unaware of the other's existence. On Julius' 35th birthday, Werner finally tells Julius about Vincent. With Werner's blessing, Julius proceeds to Los Angeles to find his brother. Julius eventually tracks Vincent down in jail, where he is being held for unpaid parking tickets and driving with an expired license.

Julius bails Vincent out, but Vincent does not believe his story and abandons him in a parking lot. Julius pursues Vincent to his workplace and finds him being beaten up by Morris Klane, one of three loan shark brothers that Vincent owes $20,000. Julius subdues Morris, earning Vincent's trust and respect. He later meets Vincent's girlfriend Linda Mason and enters a romantic relationship with her sister Marnie.

Over dinner, Vincent shows Julius a document he stole from the orphanage that shows their mother is still alive, but believing that she abandoned him at birth, Vincent shows no interest in finding her. Believing that their mother may have also been lied to, Julius tracks one of their six fathers to the address on the document. The father directs Julius to Dr. Mitchell Traven, Werner's colleague, in New Mexico.

Vincent steals a late model Cadillac from a parking garage run by his buddy (to sell to a chop shop) and finds a prototype fuel injector in the trunk that was to be delivered to industrialist Beetroot McKinley in Houston, in return for $5 million. Vincent decides to pose as the delivery man, Mr. Webster, and deliver the fuel injector himself so he can collect the money and pay off his debts. He reluctantly allows Julius, Linda and Marnie to accompany him to New Mexico to find Traven, while Webster begins pursuing Vincent. In the process, he encounters the Klane brothers and shoots them in the legs as a warning to keep away from Vincent.

In New Mexico, Traven reveals the truth to the twins, pointing out that Julius resulted from the best genes, and spitefully denouncing Vincent as having come from the "useless" genetic material, leaving Vincent distraught. After Julius threatens him, Traven directs them to Santa Fe, where their mother lives in an art colony. Julius convinces Vincent to regain his spirits and they continue their journey.

On the way to Santa Fe, the twins are accosted by the Klane brothers, but they fight them off for the last time. At the art colony in Santa Fe, a gardener informs Julius and Vincent that their mother has died. They leave, unaware that the gardener was in fact Mary Ann, who did not believe their story, having been told she only had one son who died at birth.

Abandoning Julius and the girls in New Mexico, Vincent heads to Houston alone to deliver the prototype to Beetroot. Julius chases after Vincent, sensing his whereabouts thanks to twin telepathy, and finds him seconds after the exchange with Beetroot. Webster appears and kills Beetroot and his bodyguard, demanding the money from Vincent. Julius intercepts Webster, allowing Vincent to escape, but Vincent returns and agrees to give Webster the money to save Julius. Webster decides to kill them anyway for seeing his face, but Vincent, at Julius' subtle prompting, kills him by dropping a heavy chain onto him and burying him.

Julius and Vincent return both the prototype and $4 million (with Vincent skimming $1 million) and use a $50,000 reward to pay off Vincent's debts and start a consulting firm. Their publicity reaches the art colony, and Mary Ann learns that her sons are alive. She violently confronts Traven for concealing the truth and then tracks Julius and Vincent down to their workplace, where they share a warm reunion.

Sometime later, Julius and Vincent marry Marnie and Linda. Both marriages produce twin children, and the couples are last seen meeting their mother and Professor Werner on an outing.

Cast

Production
The original music score was composed by Georges Delerue and Randy Edelman. Edelman has scored three more films for the director (Ghostbusters II; Kindergarten Cop; and Six Days, Seven Nights) whereas this was Delerue's only work for him.

Notably, this was Arnold Schwarzenegger's first time starring in a major comedy. Because the studio viewed this as a significant risk compared with having Schwarzenegger make another profitable action film, Schwarzenegger voluntarily took no salary in exchange for a share of the film's profits. Co-star Danny DeVito and director Ivan Reitman made similar deals. When the film was a major financial success – box office of $216M against an $18M production budget – the three together earned a significant share of the overall profits. In a 2016 interview with Graham Bensinger in which Schwarzenegger recounted this story, Schwarzenegger stated that the decision to "invest in myself" by trying comedy and forgoing the salary in exchange for a share of the film's profits was one of the best decisions of his entire life.

Filming
The bridge that Vincent drives across is the Rio Grande Gorge Bridge near Taos, New Mexico.

Music

Soundtrack
A self-titled song performed by Philip Bailey and Little Richard rose to no. 82 on the Billboard Hot 100 chart in 1989.

Reception

Box office
The film was a commercial success, opening as the number one film in the United States earning $11 million on its opening weekend. It retained the top spot for the next two weekends and went on to gross $112 million domestically, being the fifth biggest grossing film in the United States released in 1988. The film was released in the United Kingdom on March 17, 1989, and topped the country's box office that weekend. It grossed $216 million worldwide.

Following the film's success, Reitman and Schwarzenegger teamed up again for Kindergarten Cop (1990) and then again for Junior (1994), which also starred DeVito.

Critical response
Twins received mixed reviews from critics upon release. 
The consensus states: "Though it offers a few modest pleasures for undemanding viewers, Twins leans too heavily on the wackiness of its premise to overcome its narrative shortcomings." On Metacritic the film has a score of 53 out of 100 based on reviews from 13 critics, indicating "mixed or average reviews". Audiences polled by CinemaScore gave the film an average grade of "A−" on an A+ to F scale.

Roger Ebert gave the film 3 out of 4 stars, calling it "engaging entertainment with some big laughs and a sort of warm goofiness."

Vincent Canby of The New York Times gave the film a negative review: "In Twins, which is supposed to be funny, the former Mr. Universe and pint-sized Danny DeVito play twins, the result of a genetic experiment that went awry. To the extent that Twins is carried by anybody, it is carried by Mr. DeVito. Mr. Schwarzenegger is dead weight."

Possible sequel
In March 2012, Universal announced the development of a sequel titled Triplets with Schwarzenegger and DeVito due to return with Eddie Murphy as their long lost triplet brother. Reitman was set to co produce.

In April 2015, it was announced that plans for the film were put on hold. In March 2018, Schwarzenegger confirmed that the script for Triplets was finished and that Murphy was officially attached to the film. Schwarzenegger briefly discussed how Murphy's character became the triplet brother of his and DeVito's characters saying "funny thing that happens in the mixing of the sperm". It was unknown if Reitman would still be involved in the film, as originally announced in 2012.

In September 2021, it was announced filming will commence in January 2022 in Boston, with Ivan Reitman directing, Schwarzenegger and DeVito reprising their roles as Julius and Vincent Benedict, and Tracy Morgan replacing Eddie Murphy as Schwarzenegger and DeVito's long lost triplet brother. However, Reitman died in February 2022, leaving the status of the film unclear.

See also
 Junior: A 1994 movie also starring Schwarzenegger and DeVito and directed by Reitman.
 List of American films of 1988

References

External links
 
 
 
 
 

1988 films
1980s buddy comedy films
1988 comedy films
American buddy comedy films
1980s English-language films
Fictional duos
Fictional twins
Films about adoption
Films about twin brothers
Films directed by Ivan Reitman
Films set in Los Angeles
Films set in New Mexico
Films set in Texas
Films shot in New Mexico
Films scored by Georges Delerue
Films scored by Randy Edelman
Films with screenplays by William Davies
Films produced by Ivan Reitman
Films with screenplays by Timothy Harris (writer)
Films with screenplays by Herschel Weingrod
Twins in fiction
Universal Pictures films
1980s American films